Cassandra Tate (born September 11, 1990) is an American track and field athlete specializing in the 400 meters hurdles. She won the bronze medal at the 2015 World Championships in Beijing.

International competitions

Personal bests
Outdoor
400 meters – 52.51 (Baton Rouge 2015)
400 meters hurdles – 54.01 (Eugene 2015)
Indoor
400 meters – 52.40 (Albuquerque 2014)

References

External links
 
 
 

1990 births
Living people
American female hurdlers
World Athletics Championships athletes for the United States
Place of birth missing (living people)
World Athletics Championships medalists
Diamond League winners
World Athletics Indoor Championships winners
21st-century American women
20th-century American women